Edmond L'Hotte (10 January 1892 – 11 June 1970) was a French equestrian. He competed in the individual jumping event at the 1920 Summer Olympics.

References

External links
 

1892 births
1970 deaths
French male equestrians
Olympic equestrians of France
Equestrians at the 1920 Summer Olympics
Sportspeople from Versailles, Yvelines